Wolong Gang is a cultural site and scenic area in Nanyang city, Henan province, People's Republic of China. It is famous for Zhuge Liang, a chancellor of Shu Han during the Three Kingdoms period of Chinese history, who lived there for about ten years. Zhuge Liang is also known as Wolong (卧龙, meaning Crouching Dragon), and he was posthumously named the Marquis of Wu.

History
The worship of Zhuge Liang in Wolong Gang dates from the Jin Dynasty. It flourished during the Tang Dynasty and Song Dynasty. In 1317, Emperor Renzong of Yuan gave the historic buildings in Wolong Gang the name of Temple of the Marquis of Wu. In 1711, historic buildings were rebuilt according to the traditional Longgang full picture. The Qing Dynasty built the Wolong gang ten scenic spots and Wolong College.

Nowadays, Wolong Gang has historic buildings built during the Yuan Dynasty, the Ming Dynasty and the Qing Dynasty. Wolong Gang also has stone inscriptions, steles, and the couplet, all of them dating from the Han Dynasty to the Qing Dynasty. It has more of this kind of cultural relic than the other temples of the Marquis of Wu in China. Yue Fei's handwritten stone inscription Chu Shi Biao is very precious among them.

Literary works

Tourist attraction
Temple of the Marquis of Wu of Nanyang: a place to worship Zhuge Liang and an important heritage site under state protection in China.
Hanhua Museum: a museum which mainly displays Han Dynasty stone pictures.

References
诸葛亮文化节掀起千古人龙热

Buildings and structures in Nanyang, Henan
Parks in Henan